The Attacks near Dobrosin,were attacks launched by the LAPMB against stations of the police of the Federal Republic of Yugoslavia near the LAPMB stronghold of Dobrosin during the 2000-2001 insurgency in the Preševo Valley.

Background 
The LAPMB was created on January 26, 2000. On that day, Serbian police officers invaded the predominantly Albanian village of Dobrosin on the border with Kosovo. The village was part of the "demilitarized zone" following the Kosovo War and Kumanovo Agreement in 1999. After a firefight between the Serbian police and Albanian residents, two Albanian brothers were killed. Since then, uniformed LAPMB started to appear in the village and captured the Village earlier that year in March.

Attacks 

From 21-27 November the LAPMB committed synchronized attacks on the Dobrosin security checkpoint, and on the positions of the police on the corners of Devojačka Čuka and Osoje.

Due to the Heavy fighting, members of the Special Police Units from Gornji Milanovac were forced to withdraw to Konculj, Lucane and Bujanovac. Police withdrawal was hampered and slowed down due to lack of knowledge of the terrain. During the withdrawal, the retreating Serbian Units were ambushed by members of the LAPMB. In this attack, rebels killed 3 members of the MUP and wounded 5 more.

Serb police retreated from the demilitarized zone after four policemen were killed and another two wounded, after which the LAPMB took control over Dobrosin, Lučane, Končul, Mali Trnovac and Breznica, as well as 4 police stations.

References 

Albanian nationalism in Serbia
Dobrosin
Preševo Valley
Serbia and Montenegro
Yugoslav Wars
2001 in Yugoslavia
Dobrosin
Dobrosin
Dobrosin
May 2001 events in Europe